One Size Fits All is an Australian sketch comedy television series that was first screened on the ABC in 2000. The series starred six female comedians and featured comedy sketches, one-liners, monologues, six-on-one interviews and free-form dancing.

Cast
Matilda Donaldson
 Christine Basil
 Mary-Anne Fahey
Lynda Gibson
 Andrea Powell
 Denise Scott

Supporting cast
 Rod Quantock
 Robyn Butler
 Sean Dooley
 Russell Fletcher
 Linda Haggar
 Vin Hedger
 Fahey Younger

References

External links
 

Australian comedy television series
Australian Broadcasting Corporation original programming
2000 Australian television series debuts
2000 Australian television series endings
Australian television sketch shows